Manuel Felipe de Tovar (1 January 1803, in Caracas – 21 February 1866, in Paris) was the president of Venezuela from 1859–1861.

Personal life
Manuel Felipe de Tovar was married to Encarnación Rivas Pacheco, who served as First Lady of Venezuela from 1859–1861.

See also 
Venezuela
Presidents of Venezuela

References

External links
  Manuel Felipe Tovar — Official biography.
   Manuel Felipe Tovar

Presidents of Venezuela
Vice presidents of Venezuela
Politicians from Caracas
Venezuelan people of Spanish descent
1803 births
1866 deaths
Conservative Party (Venezuela) politicians